Lovegrove is a surname. Notable people with the surname include:

Brendhan Lovegrove, New Zealand comedian and public speaker
Fred Lovegrove (1939–2013), American politician
Gavin Lovegrove (born 1967), javelin thrower from New Zealand
James Lovegrove (born 1965), British writer
Paul Lovegrove, American politician
Rhys Lovegrove (born 1987), Australian rugby league footballer
Ross Lovegrove (born 1958), British industrial designer
Stephen Lovegrove (born 1966), English civil servant
Suzi Lovegrove (1955–1987), American-born woman whose battle with AIDS was chronicled in the television documentary Suzi's Story, wife of Vince Lovegrove
Vince Lovegrove (1948–2012), Australian journalist, music manager and television producer

See also
Lovegrove Point